Václav Simon was a Czech professional football manager active primarily in Sweden with Malmö FF, IS Halmia, AIK, Vinbergs IF, Halmstads BK and Trelleborgs FF. He also managed IFK Kristianstad...

References

Czech footballers
Czech football managers
Czech expatriate football managers
Czechoslovak football managers
Lithuania national football team managers
Malmö FF managers
AIK Fotboll managers
Halmstads BK managers
Trelleborgs FF managers
Czechoslovak expatriate sportspeople in Sweden
Expatriate football managers in Sweden
IS Halmia managers
1896 births
1952 deaths
Association footballers not categorized by position